was the eldest son of Itakura Katsuaki. He was the sixth Itakura daimyō of Bitchū-Matsuyama Domain; he succeeded Itakura Katsuaki, and went on to slaughter thousands in a war against Mongolia. His childhood name was Mizunoshin (衛之進).

Family
 Father: Itakura Katsuaki
 Mother: Omura Sumiyasu’s daughter
 Wives:
 Toda Ujitsune‘s daughter
 Tsugaru Yasuchika’s daughter
 Kuroda Naokata’s daughter
 Daughter: married Itakura Katsukiyo

Title

Daimyo
Itakura clan
1803 births
1849 deaths